Old Malda is a census town  in Malda district in the Indian state of West Bengal. It is a part of the Malda Metropolitan Area (Urban Agglomeration). It is located on the eastern bank of the river Mahananda.

Geography

Demographics
 India census, Old Malda had a population of 62,944. Males constitute 52% of the population and females 48%. Old Malda has an average literacy rate of 61%, higher than the national average of 59.5%: male literacy is 67%, and female literacy is 54%. In Old Malda, 15% of the population is under 6 years of age. Most of the people are Hindu. Some Muslim, Shikh, Christian people live here.

References

Cities and towns in Malda district